Romeo! is a sitcom that aired on Nickelodeon from 2003 to 2006, totaling 53 episodes. The filming was done in Vancouver, British Columbia, while the show takes place in Seattle, Washington. The show stars Romeo as a fictionalized version of himself, known as "Ro".

Reruns occasionally aired on Nickelodeon, BET, MTV2 and The N until December 26, 2008.

Premise
Romeo Miller raps in a band called Pieces of The Puzzle along with three of his siblings. His father, who is a record producer, provides guidance, along with Romeo's stepmother and nanny.

Cast

Main cast
Romeo as Romeo "Ro" Miller, the mischievous main character and leader of the family band ("The Romeo Show"). Romeo plays basketball and raps with Pieces of The Puzzle (Later known as The Romeo Show). In Season 1, in the middle of the show Romeo would have an imagination in a video game world and sees in his perspective.
Master P as Percy Miller, the father of Romeo and his siblings who was widowed in his first marriage and works as a big-time record producer. Percy is warm and loving, though sometimes strict, toward his children. Until Angie came along he was widowed.
Erica O'Keith as Jodi Miller, the former lead singer of the band who is currently in college. The oldest sibling in the family, Jodi excels in school and has many friends. Jodi can be somewhat arrogant and controlling, but ultimately loves her siblings. 
Noel Callahan as Louis Testaverde Miller, the adopted brother of Romeo and his other siblings, who's the same age as Romeo. Louis plays keyboard and guitar for the band. The Millers adopted Louis as their son sometime before the start of the show, but they love him deeply and treat him as their own son/brother, and he has quickly become Romeo's best friend. Louis is generally more cautious than Romeo.
Zachary Isaiah Williams as Gary Miller, the second youngest of the Miller siblings, who does the turntables and drums for the band. Williams also had played Romeo's brother in the 2003 film Honey
Natashia Williams as Angeline "Angie" Eckert Miller (Season 2 - Season 3), Percy's second wife and the stepmother of Romeo, Jodi, Gary and Louis. Angeline's a kind, intelligent and loving woman who treats Jodi and the boys like they were her own children, and is also skilled at interpreting the emotions of the Millers. Angeline is also an architect. 
Victoria Jackson as Marie Rogers (Season 1), the Miller's eccentric nanny who formerly worked for a circus. Mrs. Rogers left after Season 1 to attend vet school.
Morris Smith as Robert "Bobby" Miller, the youngest Miller child who's the half-sibling to Jodi and the boys. Angeline became pregnant with Bobby soon after she and Percy got married, and he was born in the season 3 episode, "Baby on Board!," a week before his due date. His nickname is "Big Bobby."

Recurring cast
 Brittney Wilson as Myra Strepp, Romeo's friend and Louis's girlfriend.
 Simeon Taole as Riley Morrison (seasons 2+), Romeo's best friend.
 Brittany Moldowan as Peyton Cruz (seasons 2+), Romeo's crush in Season 2.
 Ashley Phillips as Ashley Phillips (seasons 2+), the new lead singer of the band who goes to Romeo's and Louis's school.

Episodes

Home media
Although none of the episodes were released on home media, two of the episodes were only released on compilation sets.

References

External links
 

2000s American single-camera sitcoms
2000s American teen sitcoms
2000s American music television series
2000s American black television series
2003 American television series debuts
2006 American television series endings
2000s Canadian teen sitcoms
2000s Canadian music television series
2003 Canadian television series debuts
2006 Canadian television series endings
American television series with live action and animation
Canadian television series with live action and animation
2000s Nickelodeon original programming
English-language television shows
Hip hop television
Television series about children
Television series about families
Television series about teenagers
Television series about siblings
Television shows filmed in Vancouver
Television shows set in Seattle
YTV (Canadian TV channel) original programming
2000s Black Canadian television series
American black sitcoms
Canadian black sitcoms